The 2015–16 UCI Track Cycling World Cup was a multi-race tournament over a track cycling season. It was the 24th series of the UCI Track Cycling World Cup organised by the UCI. The series ran from 30 October 2015 to 17 January 2016 and consisted of three rounds in Cali, Cambridge and Hong Kong.

Series 
This season of World Cup consisted of three rounds, in Cali (Colombia), Cambridge (New Zealand) and Hong Kong.

Cali, Colombia 
The first round was hosted in Cali. Cali is the 3rd most populated city in Colombia and a regular host of the World Cup series, hosting the series for the thirteenth time this season. Unlike the other two rounds of this series, the racing was held on three full days between 30 October 2015 and 1 November 2015 at the Velódromo Alcides Nieto Patiño. The venue had hosted the UCI Track Cycling World Championships in 2014.

Cambridge, New Zealand 
The second round was hosted in Cambridge, which is a small town in the North Island of New Zealand. It is 24 kilometers away from the closest city Hamilton. This round was held between 5 and 6 December 2015 at the Avantidrome. Avantidrome is an indoor velodrome built in 2014.

Hong Kong 
The last round of this World Cup series was hosted in Hong Kong. This round was held between 16 and 17 January 2016 at the Hong Kong Velodrome. It was the second international event after the velodrome was built in 2013.

Overall team standings
Overall team standings are calculated based on total number of points gained by the team's riders in each event. The top ten teams after the third and final round are listed below:

Results

Men

Women

References

External links

World Cup Classics
World Cup Classics
UCI Track Cycling World Cup
2015 in Colombian sport
2015 in New Zealand sport
2016 in Hong Kong sport
Sport in Cambridge, New Zealand